Matias O'Neille (born 21 January 1978) is an Argentine former professional tennis player.

O'Neille, a player from Buenos Aires, spent most of his professional tennis career competing in satellite and ITF Futures tournaments. He won three Futures doubles titles and also claimed one ATP Challenger title, partnering Mariano Delfino at the Trani Cup in 2003. His best singles ranking was 416 in the world and he was ranked as high as 401 in doubles.

Challenger/Futures titles

Doubles

References

External links
 
 

1978 births
Living people
Argentine male tennis players
Tennis players from Buenos Aires
21st-century Argentine people